This is a list of the rulers of the Kingdom of Kongo known commonly as the Manikongos (KiKongo: Mwenekongo). Mwene (plural: Awene) in Kikongo meant a person holding authority, particularly judicial authority, derived from the root -wene which meant, by the sixteenth century at least, territory over which jurisdiction was held.  The ruler of Kongo was the most powerful mwene in the region who the Portuguese regarded as the king (in Kikongo ntinu) upon their arrival in 1483.

The kings claimed several titles and the following royal style in Portuguese "Pela graça de de Deus Rei do Congo, do Loango, de Cacongo e de Ngoio, aquém e além do Zaire, Senhor dos Ambundos e de Angola, de Aquisima, de Musuru, de Matamba, de Malilu, de Musuko e Anzizo, da conquista de Pangu-Alumbu, etc", that means "By the grace of God King of Kongo, of Loango, of Kakongo and of Ngoyo, on this side of the Zaire and beyond it, Lord of the Ambundu and of Angola, of Aquisima, of Musuru, of Matamba, of Malilu, of Musuko and Anzizo, of the conquest of Pangu-Alumbu, etc".

Kandas, Gerações and Houses
The kingdom of Kongo had a formal state apparatus, in which most positions (rendas in Portuguese-language documents, meaning income bearing positions) were in the hands of the king, and the king himself was elected by powerful officials.  Kings sought and held office with the assistance of a kanda. Each kanda (plural: makanda) was a faction which organized people according to a common goal, often but not always rooted in a kin-based relationship. Kandas generally took the name of a person (i.e. Nimi, Nlaza or Mpanzu), but could also take the name of a location or title such as Mbala (court)) or birthplace (Kwilu or Nsundi).  The Kikongo prefix "ki" is added onto these names to mean "people with something in common". These factions were recorded as gerações or casas (lineages or houses) in Kongo documents written in Portuguese.  Until the mid-seventeenth century, following the Battle of Mbwila, these factions were short-lived and fluctuating, but following the battle, factions were much firmer and lasted for generations, particularly the Kimpanzu and Kinlaza. The Quilombo dos Palmares, a Maroon kingdom formed in Northeast Brazil, was founded by princes and nobles who were enslaved and transported to Portuguese Brazil after the battle in Kongo. There, they retained their titles and their lineage survived even after the kingdom itself was destroyed.

Dynasties
When the Portuguese arrived in Kongo in 1483, the reigning king represented the Nimi kanda. This kanda was probably descended from Nimi a Nzima, father of the founder of Kongo. Divisions emerged within the kanda during succession disputes, for example, following the death of Afonso I in 1542, his son Pedro I and grandson Diogo I formed two opposed factions, that of Pedro was called the Kibala (court) faction, and the other, whose name is unknown that followed Diogo. Other elections in the sixteenth century probably also involved similar factions, though the details are unknown.	

King Álvaro I was the first king of the House of Kwilu (Portuguese: Coulo). This kanda or lineage was named for the birthplace of Álvaro, north of the capital city. The Kwilu reigned until 1614 when Antonio da Silva, Duke of Mbamba intervened to place Bernardo I on the throne, in place of Álvaro II's minor son, who would eventually take office as Álvaro III.	

Another kanda, the House of Nsundi, later known as the Kinkanga a Mvika, took control of Kongo in 1622 under Pedro II, and retained it through the reign of his son, Garcia I. Garcia never held power strongly, and the Kimpanzu returned to power under Ambrosio I.  Kimpanzu domination ended in 1641 when two brothers Álvaro and Garcia of the new House of Kinlaza overthrew Álvaro V and took power. The members of the Kikanga a Mvika were all killed or absorbed into the Kinlaza by 1657. The Kinlaza dynasty would reign until Kongo's catastrophic civil war following the 1665 Battle of Mbwila, when sporadic and violent alternation followed.

The capital was destroyed in 1678. Its destruction forced the claimants from both sides of the conflict to rule from mountain fortresses. The Kinlaza retreated to Mbula where they founded the capital of Lemba. Earlier another branch of Kinlaza, under the leadership of Garcia III of Kongo founded a settlement at Kibangu. The Kimpanzu based their struggle for the throne at Mbamba Luvota in the south of Soyo. A new faction appeared in the form of the Água Rosada kanda, headquartered at the mountain fortress of Kibangu. This might be considered a new house formed from both the Kinlaza and Kimpanzu, its founders were the children of a Kimpanzu father and a Kinlaza mother. All parties claimed kingship over Kongo (or what was left of it), but their power rarely spread outside their fortresses or the immediate surrounding area.

The country was finally reunited by Pedro IV of the Água Rosada kanda. Pedro IV declared a doctrine of shared power by which the throne would shift (in due time) from Kinlaza to the Kimpanzu and back., while the Água Rosada appear to have continued as neutral in Pedro's fortress of Kibangu.

The system functioned sporadically, with considerable fighting, until 1764 when José I of the Kinlaza faction usurped the throne and thrust the country back into civil war.  The Kinlaza enjoyed a short-lived second dynasty that ended in 1788.  After that, the throne moved through various royal hands until the kingship was extinguished in 1914.

Elections
The selection of kings of Kongo was by a variety of principles, as kings themselves evoked different methods of selection in their letters announcing their succession.  Typically the kingdom was said to pass by election, though the electors and the process they used changed over time and according to circumstances.  Frequently election seems to have been a combination of elective and hereditary principles.

Kings of Kongo
The following section is divided into periods based on kanda or house rulership. Most houses reigned of a distinct period with few if any intervals. This is not the case, however; after the Kongo Civil War. During this period you will note the name of each king's kanda alongside their reign.

Pre-colonial rulers

Ancestors of later rulers
According to oral tradition, the first king was the son of chief Nimi and his consort of unknown name, Mwene Mbata's daughter. Most of the succeeding dynasties either claim descent from this union or otherwise derive their legitimacy from it.

House of Kilukeni/Lukeni kanda (1390s–1568)

House of Kwilu/Kwilu kanda (1568–1622)

House of Nsundi/Kinkanga a Mvika kanda (1622–1626)

House of Kwilu/Kwilu kanda (1626–1636)

House of Kimpanzu/Mpanzu kanda (1636)

House of Kinlaza/Nlaza kanda (1636–1665)

Civil War (1665–1709)
Kings of São Salvador (1665–1678 and 1691–1709)

Kings of Kibangu for the House of Kinlaza (1678–1704)

Kings of Nkondo for the House of Kimpanzu (1666–1709)

Awenekongo of Lemba-Mbula for the House of Kinlaza (1669–1716)

Mwenekongo of Mbamba-Lovata for the House of Kimpanzu (1678–1715)

Reunification and Elective Monarchy (1709–1888)
 Pedro IV Nusamu a Mvemba of the House of the Agua Rosada (ruled Kibangu December 1695 – early 1709; ruled reunited kingdom from São Salvador February 1709 – 21 February 1718)
 Manuel II Mpanzu a Nimi of the House of Kimpanzu (ruled February 1718 – 21 April 1743)
 Garcia IV Nkanga a Mvandu of the House of Kinlaza from Mbula (ruled 27 July 1743 – 31 March 1752)
 Nicolau I Misaki mia Nimi of the House of Kimpanzu (ruled 27 August 1752 – post 1758)
 Afonso IV Nkanga a Nkanga of the House of Kinlaza
 António II Mvita a Mpanzu of the House of Kimpanzu
 Sebastião I Nkanga kia Nkanga of the House of Kinlaza
 Pedro V Ntivila a Nkanga of the House of Kimpanzu (ruled September 1763 – 1764)
 Álvaro XI Nkanga a Nkanga of the House of Kinlaza from Nkondo (ruled May 1764 – 1778)
 José I Mpasi a Nkanga of the House of Kinlaza (ruled 1778–1785)
 Afonso V of Kongo of the House of Kinlaza from Nkondo (ruled 1785–1787)
 Álvaro XII of Kongo of the House of Kinlaza from Nkondo (ruled 1787–unknown)
 Aleixo I Mpanzu a Mbandu (ruled unknown–1793)
 Joaquim I of Kongo (ruled 1793–94)
 Henrique II Masaki ma Mpanzu (ruled 10 January 1794 – 1803)
 Garcia V Nkanga a Mvemba (ruled 1803 – start 1830)
 André II Mvizi a Lukeni (ruled start 1830–1842)
 Henrique III Mpanzu a Nsindi a Nimi a Lukeni (ruled 1842 – January 1857)
 Álvaro XIII of Kongo, also known as Ndongo, (ruled January 1857 – 7 August 1859)
 Peter V of Kongo, also known as Elelo, (ruled 7 August 1859 – February 1891; signed treaty of vassalage with Portugal in 1888)

Portuguese vassalage (1888–1914)

Pretenders to the throne since 1914
 Álvaro XV Afonso of Kongo, also known as Nzinga, (ruled 1915–1923)
 Pedro VII Afonso of Kongo (ruled 1923–1955)
 António III Afonso of Kongo (ruled 1955–1957)
 Isabel Maria da Gama of Kongo (f., 1st regency 1957–1962)
 Pedro VIII Afonso of Kongo, also known as Mansala, (ruled September to October 1962)
 Isabel Maria da Gama of Kongo (f., 2nd regency 1962–1975)
 Interregnum, 1975–2000
  Josè Henrique da Silva Meso Mankala of Kongo was born in 1942 and is said to be the grandson of King Pedro VII. He serves as head of the royal family and leader of the Kongolese nobility. And has ruled since 19 November 2000. He is living in exile in Cabinda.

The head of the nucleus of the Traditional Authorities of the Royal Court of Kongo is Afonso Mendes and is living in Mbanza-Kongo

Brazilian branch of Palmares
The Quilombo dos Palmares was a Maroon Kingdom formed in the Captaincy of Pernambuco in what is now Northeast Brazil sometime around 1605 by princes and nobles from the Kingdom of Kongo. They had been captured during the Battle of Mbwila, and were subsequently transported there as slaves. After having escaped slavery, they retained their royal and noble titles. The members of this branch probably belonged to the House of Awenekongo of the Nlaza kanda of Antonio I.

 Ganga Zumba, King (ruled 1630–1678). A son of Princess Aqualtune, daughter of an unidentified king of Kongo. She was present at the Battle of Mbwila.
 Ganga Zona, King (ruled 1678–1678). A brother of Ganga Zumba.
 Zumbi, also known as Francisco, King (ruled 1678–1695). A nephew of Ganga Zumba, son of his sister Princess Sabina. Today, a National Hero in Brazil.
 Camuanga, King (ruled 1695–?). A son of Zumbi and the last known member of the lineage in the Americas.

Further reading
This list is constructed primarily from that found in Graziano Saccardo, Congo e Angola con la storia dell'antica missione dei cappuccini (3 vols, Milan, 1982–83), vol. 3, pp. 11–14.  Saccardo bases his reconstruction on several king lists produced over time, by António da Silva, Duke of Mbamba in 1617, by António de Teruel in 1664, by Pedro Mendes in 1710 and by Francisco das Necessidades in 1844.  In addition, many of the kings wrote letters and signed them with both their names and their numbers, and Saccardo has found many of these to verify the kinglists.

Saccardo's king list has been modified in the following manner:  the Kikongo names of the kings have been given in a Kikongo form following norms established in Joseph de Munck, Kinkulu kia Nsi eto (Tumba, 1956, 2nd ed, Matadi, 1971). The Christian names of the kings are given in modern Portuguese spelling. In addition, Saccardo's entries have been updated by a number of sources, most notably the king list, unknown to him found in the Instituto Histórico e Geográfico Brasileiro (Rio de Janeiro) Manuscritos, Lata 6, pasta 2. "Catallogo dos reis de Congo" MS of c. 1758.

See also
Kingdom of Kongo
Kongo Civil War
Kanda
Kinkanga
Kimpanzu
Kinlaza
Água Rosada
History of Angola

References

External links
full list with annotations
alternative list from regnal chronologies
alternative list from worlstatesmen.org
alternative list from the History Files

Kongo
Kingdom of Kongo
Kongo people